In the field of database computing, Oracle Net Services consists of sets of software which enable client applications to establish and maintain network sessions with Oracle Database servers. Since Oracle databases operate in and across a variety of software and hardware environments, Oracle Corporation supplies high-level transparent networking facilities with the intention of providing networking functionality regardless of differences in nodes and protocols.

Terminology 

 network service name (NSN): "[a] simple name for a service that resolves to a connect descriptor" For example: sales.acme.co.uk

Components 

Oracle Corporation defines Oracle Net Services as comprising:

 Oracle net
 listener
 Oracle Connection Manager
 Oracle Net Configuration assistant
 Oracle Net Manager

Oracle Net 

Oracle Net,
a proprietary networking stack, runs both on client devices and on Oracle database servers in order to set up and maintain connections and messaging between client applications and servers. Oracle Net (formerly called "SQL*Net" or "Net8") comprises two software components:

 Oracle Net Foundation Layer: makes and maintains connection sessions. The Oracle Net Foundation Layer establishes and also maintains the connection between the client application and server. It must reside on both the client and server for peer-to-peer communication to occur.
 Oracle Protocol Support: interfaces with underlying networking protocols such as TCP/IP, named pipes, or Sockets Direct Protocol (SDP).

The listener 

The listener process(es) on a server detect incoming requests from clients for connection - by default on port 1521 - and manage network-traffic once clients have connected to an Oracle database. The listener uses a configuration-file - listener.ora - to help keep track of names, protocols, services and hosts. The listener.ora file can include three sorts of parameters:

 listener-address entries
 SID_LIST entries
 control entries

Apart from pre-defined and known statically-registered databases, a listener can also accept dynamic service registration from a database.

Oracle Connection Manager 

The Oracle Connection Manager (CMAN) acts as a lightweight router for Oracle Net packets.

Oracle Net Manager 

Oracle Net Manager, a GUI tool, configures Oracle Net Services for an Oracle home on a local client or server host. (Prior to Oracle 9i known as "Net8 Assistant".)

Associated software

Utilities and tools 
 tnsping: determines the accessibility of an Oracle net service.

Software suites 
Oracle software integrating closely with and/or depending on Oracle Net Services includes:

 Oracle Clusterware
 Oracle Data Guard
 Oracle Enterprise Manager
 Oracle Internet Directory
 Oracle RAC (real application clusters)
 Oracle Streams

See also 

Transparent Network Substrate (TNS)

References 
 Arun Kumar, John Kanagaraj and Richard Stroupe: Oracle Database 10g Insider Solutions. Sams, 2005.

External links 
"Oracle Network Configuration"

Footnotes 

Oracle software